Mahela Lakmal Udawatte known as Mahela Udawatte (born 19 July 1986) is a professional Sri Lankan International cricketer. He played as opening batsman in debut series in 2008, which shifted to become a middle order batsman for his comeback in 2017. He played his first Test Match against West Indies in 2018 after 10 years from his limited overs debut.

Domestic career
Straight after his  left from  school, he joined Chilaw Marians SC and Promoted to open the batting. He has also played for Kings of Khulna in Bangladesh's NCL T20 Bangladesh.

He is usually opens the batting and made his first class debut in 2004–05 in Sri Lanka and he was also named in the thirty-man provincial squad for the 2007 World Cup but failed to make it to the final fifteen.

His average in first class cricket may not be that great, but it his hard hitting capabilities that have left many an expert rooting for him. Udawatte plays first class cricket for the Chilaw Marians Cricket Club. He had also  scored three centuries in only five matches in domestic competitions.

In March 2018, he was named in Kandy's squad for the 2017–18 Super Four Provincial Tournament. The following month, he was also named in Kandy's squad for the 2018 Super Provincial One Day Tournament. He was the leading run-scorer for Kandy in the tournament, with 187 runs in three matches.

In August 2018, he was named in Colombo's squad the 2018 SLC T20 League. In March 2019, he was named in Galle's squad for the 2019 Super Provincial One Day Tournament. In August 2021, he was named in the SLC Greens team for the 2021 SLC Invitational T20 League tournament.

International career
He was chosen for the Sri Lanka ODI squad for their tour of West Indies in April 2008 and played in all three ODIs. With only two fifties in 9 ODIs as an opener, Udawatte was dropped from the squad in late 2009. After 9 years, he was recalled into the T20I squad for the 3-match series against Pakistan due to unavailability of many permanent players avoid to travel Pakistan for the third T20I at Lahore. However, he scored poorly in all three matches.

In May 2018, he was named in Sri Lanka's Test squad for their series against the West Indies. He made his Test debut for Sri Lanka against the West Indies on 14 June 2018. He became the oldest Sri Lankan to debut opening in Test cricket at the age of 31. However, he got out for nought in the first innings.

References

External links

 Interview - Nothing beats mum's cooking - Mahela Udawatte
 Mahela Udawatte news, videos and photos

1986 births
Living people
Alumni of Ananda College
Sri Lankan cricketers
Sri Lanka Test cricketers
Sri Lanka One Day International cricketers
Sri Lanka Twenty20 International cricketers
Chilaw Marians Cricket Club cricketers
Wayamba cricketers
Uva cricketers
Ruhuna cricketers
Sri Lanka Cricket Combined XI cricketers
Tamil Union Cricket and Athletic Club cricketers
Basnahira cricketers
Khulna Division cricketers
Uthura Rudras cricketers
Kurunegala Warriors cricketers